Nuria del Rocío Esparch Fernández (born 19 January 1969) is a Peruvian lawyer and politician who had served as the country's Defence Minister from November 2020 to July 2021.

Early life and education
Esparch was born in Lima on 19 January, 1969. She studied law at the Pontifical Catholic University of Peru. She graduated from the Maxwell School of Citizenship and Public Affairs at Syracuse University with a Master of Public Administration in 2000.

Career
Esparch joined the public service in 1997. She was general Secretary in the ministries of Agriculture and Labor from 2001 until 2005, and served an advisor to the Vice Ministry of the Interior from 2003–2004.

She was appointed Deputy Minister of Administrative and Economic Affairs by President Alan García in 2006. From 2008 until February 2011, she was Executive President of the National Civil Service Authority (SERVIR).

From 2014 until 2018, Esparch was Manager of Institutional Relations for construction company Graña y Montero.

Esparch was appointed defence minister by interim president Francisco Sagasti on 18 November 2020, the first woman to hold the position. Later that month, she reported that 10,000 members of the country's Armed Forces were being trained to deliver COVID-19 vaccines as soon as they become available.

Awards and honors
Esparch has been given the highest civilian distinctions from the Armed Forces of Peru.

In 2021, Esparch was selected to become a member of the US National Academy of Public Administration.

References

External link

Profile of Nuria Esparch in Spanish

Living people
1969 births
People from Lima
Peruvian women lawyers
Pontifical Catholic University of Peru alumni
Maxwell School of Citizenship and Public Affairs alumni
Defense ministers of Peru
Women government ministers of Peru
Female defence ministers
21st-century Peruvian politicians
21st-century Peruvian women politicians
Fellows of the United States National Academy of Public Administration
20th-century Peruvian lawyers